Louis-Jacques Beauvais, (1759 at the Croix-des-Bouquets Saint-Domingue – September 12, 1799 in a shipwreck), was a Haitian general of the Haitian Revolution.

Biography
He was raised in France at Collège Militaire de La Flèche and spent most of his career in the colonies, and in particular in his native island.

Volunteering under the Count of Estaing during the American War, he was appointed Brigadier General on 23 July 1795 and commanded the western department of Santo Domingo in March 1796 during the revolution of his country but in 1799 did not want to take part in the civil war that took place between Toussaint Louverture and André Rigaud.

He died in the wreck of the ship which brought him back to France on 12 September 1799.

References

Sources
 
 
 
 
 
 

1759 births
1799 deaths
Haitian generals
Haitian Revolution